Ždírec nad Doubravou (until 1950 Ždírec) is a town in Havlíčkův Brod District in the Vysočina Region of the Czech Republic. It has about 3,100 inhabitants.

Administrative parts
Villages and hamlets of Benátky, Horní Studenec, Kohoutov, Nové Ransko, Nový Studenec, Stružinec and Údavy are administrative parts of Ždírec nad Doubravou.

Etymology
The name Ždírec is derived from the Old Czech word žďářit, which means "to remove the forest with fire". It refers to the method used during colonization to create space for newly established settlements.

Geography
The town proper lies in the Upper Sázava Hills, but most of the municipal territory lies in the Iron Mountains.

The town is situated on the right bank of the Doubrava River. The municipal territory lies in Iron Mountains and Žďárské vrchy protected landscape areas.

History
The first written mention of Ždírec nad Doubravou is from 1399. It was probably founded shortly before, during the colonization of the area. For centuries, it was a small village administered as a part of the Přibyslav estate, and since 1677 as part of the of Polná estate.

The worst tragedy in the history of Ždírec nad Doubravou took place on 9 May 1945, when it was damaged by a Red Army raid and dozens of inhabitants were killed. In the second half of the 20th century, the village began to be expanded, and the number of inhabitants grew. In 2000, Ždírec nad Doubravou was promoted to a town.

Twin towns – sister cities

Ždírec nad Doubravou is twinned with:
 Michelhausen, Austria
 Velké Pavlovice, Czech Republic

References

External links

Populated places in Havlíčkův Brod District
Cities and towns in the Czech Republic